Wolper is a surname. Notable people with the surname include:

David L. Wolper (1928–2010), American television and film producer
Pierre Wolper, Belgian computer scientist

Characters
Faith Wolper, psychiatrist from Season 4 of Nip/Tuck
Mark Wolper, waiter from Sunset Beach